The Symphony Xplorer H200 is an Android smartphone manufactured by Symphony Mobile. It was introduced in January 2015 for Bangladesh.

Features 
 Network:  2G, 3G
 SIM:  Dual SIM
 Rear Camera: 13 MP
 Front Camera: 8 MP 
 Memory: 1 GB RAM
 Storage: 16 GB 
 Battery: 1800 mAh
 Size: 4.7 In
 Operating System: Android 4.4.2 KitKat
 CPU:  1.3 GHz Quad Core/MT 6582 M
 Dimensions:  137 X 68 X 8.1 mm
 Sensors:  Accelerometer, Proximity, Light, G-Sensor
 Weight: 137g
 IPS Capacitive Display
 Browser:  HTML

References

Android (operating system) devices
Mobile phones introduced in 2015